Tsey or Tsey Gorge (C'æj) is a gorge, ski resort and a tourist centres of the Republic of North Ossetia–Alania, Russia. Tsey is located in Alagirsky District and is part of North Ossetia State National park.

Ski-resort statistics

There are two chairlifts in the Tsey one of them is two-person.

Transportation
The gorge is situated less than 100 km from Vladikavkaz, the capital of North Osetia-Alania.

Main summits
Aday-Khokh 4410 m
Pik Antonovicha 4200m
Vils 3870m
Zaramag 4200 m
Pik Zolotareva 4200m
Kalper 3800m
Kaltberg 4120 m
Lagau 4124 m
Mamison 4360 m
Monakh 2990 m
Moskvich 3790m
Pik Nikolayeva 3850m
Pik Oniani 4200m
Passionariya 4000m
Pik Pliyeva 3990m
Pik Poyasova 4200m
Ronketti 4050 m
Malaya Songuti 4000m
Spartak-Tseysky
Pik Turistov
Turkhokh 4110m
Uilpata 4648 m
Ularg 4320m
Khitsan 3600m
Tsey-Khokh 4110m
Chanchakhi 4450 m
Pik Shulgina 3900m

External links
About Tsey
General info about Alagirsky District

References

Ski areas and resorts in Russia
North Ossetia–Alania
Tourist attractions in North Ossetia–Alania